Spiazzo is a comune (municipality) in Trentino in the northern Italian region Trentino-Alto Adige/Südtirol, located about  west of Trento.

Spiazzo borders the following municipalities: Ponte di Legno, Vermiglio, Giustino, Strembo, Saviore dell'Adamello, Caderzone, Massimeno, Daone, Bocenago, Pelugo and Montagne.

Demographic evolution

References

Cities and towns in Trentino-Alto Adige/Südtirol